Leon Paul Rice (born November 25, 1963) is an American college basketball coach, and the head men's basketball coach at Boise State University of the Mountain West Conference. He replaced Greg Graham as head coach of the Broncos on March 26, 2010.

In his first season, Rice led Boise State to the finals of the WAC tournament and to the semifinals of the College Basketball Invitational. He is the first Boise State head coach to win twenty games in two of his first three seasons and has twenty or more wins in nine of his twelve years. In 2013, he guided the Broncos to their first ever at-large bid to the NCAA tournament. In 2015, he led the Broncos to their only Mountain West regular season championship, Boise State's first conference title since 2008, and was named the MWC coach of the year. On February 13, 2021, Rice became the winningest head coach in Boise State history with his 214th victory.

Previously an assistant coach at Gonzaga for eleven seasons, Rice was newly promoted head coach Mark Few's first outside hire in July 1999. He is cited by Few as being instrumental to the Bulldogs' current and past success. According to Few, Rice occasionally created stories about what opposing student sections were saying about Gonzaga star Adam Morrison in order to pump him up prior to games.

On May 5th, 2022 Coach Leon Rice was named as an assistant coach for Team USA and helped lead them to the 2022 FIBA Under-18 Americas Championship.

Head coaching record

Personal 
Born in Richland, Washington, Rice graduated from Columbia Basin College, a junior college where he played football, followed by Washington State University in Pullman in 1986 with a degree in physical education. He later earned a master's in athletic administration from the University of Oregon in Eugene.

Rice and his wife, Robin, have three boys together, Brock, Max, and Kade. The eldest, Brock, completed his freshman basketball season at Northwest Christian University, where he averaged 5.1 points off the bench for the Bearcats. Max is a Senior, playing for his dad at Boise State. Kade is currently redshirting his freshman year at Boise State.

References

External links
 Boise State University athletics – Leon Rice
 Gonzaga profile
 Sports-Reference.com – Leon Rice

1963 births
Living people
American men's basketball coaches
Basketball coaches from Washington (state)
Boise State Broncos men's basketball coaches
College men's basketball head coaches in the United States
Columbia Basin Hawks football players
Gonzaga Bulldogs men's basketball coaches
Junior college men's basketball coaches in the United States
Northern Colorado Bears men's basketball coaches
Oregon Ducks men's basketball coaches
People from Richland, Washington